Beau Kittredge is a semi-professional Ultimate player for the New York Empire of the American Ultimate Disc League (AUDL), author, illustrator, and mobile video game entrepreneur. He is considered to be one of the greatest Ultimate players of all time, noted for his top-end speed and athleticism. As of 2020, Kittredge has won one college title (three finals), six USA Ultimate club titles (nine finals), seven world championships, and five AUDL titles. He is popularly known for a video in which he jumped up over an opponent to catch the disc while playing with the University of Colorado.

Personal life
Kittredge was born in Fairbanks, Alaska in 1982. He then went to Lathrop High School before going to the University Of Colorado. He currently lives in Greenwich, Connecticut in a home provided by the New York Empire as a part of his contract.

Ultimate career

Amateur Club 
Kittredge played Ultimate for University of Colorado Mamabird, winning one collegiate championship, before playing for club teams Johnny Bravo, Revolver, and PoNY, winning a total of six club titles. He has also played for the United States national team, winning two WFDF World Ultimate and Guts Championships and three World Games titles. He has two world championships representing Revolver in the Open division at the WFDF World Ultimate Club Championships.

Semi-Professional 
In 2013, Kittredge signed with the San Francisco Dogfish of the now-defunct Major League Ultimate. After a season with the Dogfish, he moved to the San Jose Spiders, an AUDL team. In his first season for the Spiders, Kittredge recorded 36 goals, 32 assists and 31 blocks, whilst starting all 15 games. The Spiders finished the season by beating Toronto Rush 28–18 to win the 2014 AUDL Championship, resulting in Kittredge being named league MVP. Kittredge helped the Spiders to a second straight Championship victory in 2015 a 17–15 win against Madison Radicals. Over the season, he recorded 33 assists, 66 goals and 24 blocks. He was also named the league MVP for the second year in a row. In 2016, Kittredge signed for the Dallas Roughnecks for their inaugural season in the league. Injury meant that Kittredge was unable to have a full season, as he tore his ACL and MCL in a game against Charlotte Express. Despite this, he recorded 9 assists, 22 goals and 9 blocks during the season, with the Roughnecks still managing a perfect 15–0 record for the season to win the 2016 AUDL Championship. Beau signed for the San Francisco FlameThrowers for the 2017 season, winning the championship over the Toronto Rush, and in 2018 went to the New York Empire where he won a championship in 2019. Although he currently (2021) will not "commit to retirement," he is not playing.

Career AUDL Statistics

Regular season

Postseason

Honors 
 UPA College Championships: 2004
 USAU Club Championships: 2010, 2011, 2013, 2015, 2017, 2018
 World Ultimate and Guts Championships: 2012, 2016
 World Ultimate Club Championships: 2010, 2014
 World Games: 2009, 2013, 2017
 AUDL Championships: 2014, 2015, 2016, 2017, 2019
 AUDL MVP: 2014, 2015

Other
Beau is a writer for Skyd Magazine, an author of five children's books, an ambassador for Early Recognition Is Critical (E.R.I.C., an organization which teaches children about early cancer awareness with the help of Ultimate), and the founder of Snowsuit Studios, a company that develops mobile video games.

References

External links
http://skydmagazine.com/author/beau/

1982 births
Living people
Ultimate (sport) players
Sportspeople from Fairbanks, Alaska
Colorado Buffaloes athletes